Air France Asie was a subsidiary of Air France founded due to the legal status of the Republic of China (Taiwan) and territory disputes with the People's Republic of China in order to allow Air France to continue flying to both countries. It became the main carrier operating from France to Taipei after Air Charter (another company operated by Air France) stopped flying in 1998.

History

Main period (1994–2004)

Owing to the disputed status of Taiwan (also known as the Republic of China), Air France could not operate flights to the island under its own name. In 1993, its subsidiary, Air Charter, began operating flights between Paris and Taipei via Hong Kong. Air France Asie started provided services from Paris' Charles de Gaulle Airport to Taipei, often stopping in Hong Kong's Kai Tak Airport (until it closed on 6 July 1998) as early as 1994. It also operated flights from Paris to Osaka via Hong Kong. Starting out with 747-400Ms, it later used Airbus A340-200s both from Air France.
 
In 2004, Air France Asie stopped flying to Taipei and ceased passenger services due to the merger of KLM that year, focusing vitally on freight. Air France did not resume passenger services to Taipei until April 2018 using the Boeing 777-300ER.

Freight service (2004–2007)

After passenger services stopped in 2004, the remaining fleet of Boeing 747-200Fs continued flying freight between Paris and Taipei although it was later it cut in 2007 possibly

Destinations

Asia 
 /
 Kai Tak Airport (1994–1998; focus city)
 Chek Lap Kok Airport (1998–2007; focus city)
 
 Osaka –Itami Airport (before opening of Kansai Airport in 1994; never operated at Kansai)
 
Taipei – Chiang Kai-shek International Airport (base)

Europe 
 
Paris – Charles de Gaulle Airport (base)

Fleet and livery 

The livery of Air France Asie differed from that of Air France by having blue and white stripes on the tailfin, rather than blue, white and red ones, representing the French Tricolour. Air France Asie used two Airbus A340-200 aircraft, F-GLZD and F-GLZE, as well as two Combi (for passengers and freight) Boeing 747-428Ms, F-GISA and F-GISC. Similarly, Air France Cargo Asie used a 747-200 Combi, F-GCBH, or the all-cargo (F-GCBL, F-GPAN and F-GBOX). Air France Asie ceased operations in 2004 while Air France Cargo Asie ceased operations in 2007.

References

 
Air France–KLM
Defunct airlines of France
Defunct airlines of Taiwan
Airlines established in 1994
Airlines disestablished in 2004
Airlines disestablished in 2007
1994 establishments in France
1994 establishments in Taiwan
2004 disestablishments in France
2004 disestablishments in Taiwan
2007 disestablishments in France
2007 disestablishments in Taiwan